Tilgate Nature Centre is a small BIAZA-accredited zoo located within Tilgate Park in Tilgate Forest, South-East Crawley, West Sussex, England. The nature centre holds 144 different animal species (in 2021), and are actively involved in breeding programmes to preserve many threatened wild species from extinction.

History 
Tilgate Nature Centre was formed in 1966 by Crawley Borough Council to breed ducklings for introduction into the three lakes at Tilgate, namely Campbells, Silt and Titmus. The zoo's focus changed over the years, and it now houses an impressive animal collection including reindeer, owls, raccoon dogs, parrots, mongooses, otters, snakes, tarantulas, lizards and various invertebrates. Tilgate Nature Centre is actively involved in breeding programmes for threatened species such as the Northern bald ibis, and has also been involved in re-introduction programmes; most notably the fen raft spider (Dolomedes plantarius) from the UK.

Attractions 
There are 144 different animal species on view (2021), and the centre is open to the paying public, with attractions such as public talks, feeds and presentations, "Animal Adoptions", "Meet the Meerkats", "Junior Keeper for a Day", and "Tapir Time" experiences. They also offer educational visits for schools and animal-themed birthday parties for wildlife-loving youngsters.

On 2 April 2016 visitors witnessed the opening of the new Australasian Zone  which includes a kangaroo and wallabies, emus, galah cockatoos and kookaburras. The Madagascan Zone which includes a serval, ring-tailed lemurs and a variety of reptiles, opened in Easter 2017. The Americas Zone, featuring a Brazilian tapir, capybaras, macaws and more, opened in April 2018.

Conservation 
Many endangered species are kept at Tilgate Nature Centre, which has taken on an important role in conservation, protecting endangered species from extinction due to rapid changes affecting their natural habitats. Tilgate Nature Centre has become nationally important for maintaining breeding groups of these animals to preserve a variety of endangered wild species. Critically endangered animals include Northern bald ibis, Utila spiny-tailed iguana, Laysan duck and swift parakeet.

Awards 
In 2020, Tilgate Nature Centre received a Gold Star Award (Switch To A Reusable) for Sustainability and Zoostainability, from the British and Irish Association of Zoos and Aquariums (BIAZA).

In 2021, a ranking of zoos in the United Kingdom by Parkdean Resorts placed Tilgate Nature Centre in first place.

References

External links 

1966 establishments in England
Conservation in the United Kingdom
Crawley
Local Nature Reserves in West Sussex
Nature centres in England
Organisations based in Crawley
Tourist attractions in West Sussex
Zoos established in 1966
Zoos in England